Scythris crypta is a species of moth belonging to the family Scythrididae.

It is native to Scandinavia.

References

Scythrididae
Moths described in 1961